Onésime Gagnon,  (October 23, 1888 – September 30, 1961) was a Canadian politician who served as the 20th Lieutenant Governor of Québec.

Background

He was born in Saint-Léon-de-Standon, Quebec, on October 23, 1888, and was the son of Onésime Gagnon and Julie Morin. He was a Rhodes scholar and was called to the Quebec Bar in 1912. From 1942 to 1958, he was a Professor in the Faculty of Law at Université Laval.

Member of Parliament

In 1930, he was elected to the House of Commons of Canada for the riding of Dorchester. A Conservative, he was re-elected in 1935. In 1935, he was a Minister without Portfolio in the cabinet of R. B. Bennett.

Provincial politics

Gagnon was a leadership candidate at the Conservative Party of Quebec convention, held in Sherbrooke on October 4 and 5, 1933. He was defeated by Maurice Duplessis with 28% of the delegates.

In 1936, he was elected to the Legislative Assembly of Quebec and became the Union Nationale Member for the riding of Matane. He was appointed Minister in the Cabinet of Maurice Duplessis, serving as Minister of Fisheries from 1936 to 1939 and as Treasurer from 1944 to 1958.

He was re-elected in 1939, 1944, 1948, 1952, and 1956.

Lieutenant governor

He resigned in 1958 to accept the office of Lieutenant-Governor of Quebec and served until his death.

Death

Gagnon died on September 30, 1961.

References

1888 births
1961 deaths
Canadian legal scholars
Canadian Rhodes Scholars
Conservative Party of Canada (1867–1942) MPs
Lieutenant Governors of Quebec
Members of the House of Commons of Canada from Quebec
Members of the King's Privy Council for Canada
Conservative Party of Quebec MNAs
Union Nationale (Quebec) MNAs
Academic staff of Université Laval
Université Laval alumni